Opodo is a Spanish-owned online travel agency which offers deals in regular and charter flights, low-cost airlines, hotels, cruises, car rental, dynamic packages, holiday packages and travel insurance. It is a pan-European enterprise, founded by a consortium of European airlines, including British Airways, Air France, Alitalia, Iberia, KLM, Lufthansa, Aer Lingus, Austrian Airlines and Finnair. The travel technology provider Amadeus owned 99.4% of the company until 2011, when it was taken over by eDreams ODIGEO. 

Opodo operates out of fourteen European countries with headquarters in Madrid. It operates Opodo-branded sites in Germany, the United Kingdom, France, Spain, Portugal, Italy, Austria, Belgium, Poland and Switzerland, as well as Travellink-branded sites in Sweden, Norway, Denmark, and Finland. It also operates several other French travel websites.

History 
Opodo was conceptualised, designed and developed by a core team at Sapient London in 2000. It launched its first site in Germany in November 2001, its UK site in January 2002, its French site in April 2002 and its Italian site in January 2006. Giovanni Bisignani, former CEO of Alitalia and present CEO of IATA (International Air Transport Association) was Opodo's first CEO. Nicolas De Santis former CMO of web currency beenz.com and president of strategy consultancy and incubator CorporateVision.io was Opodo's first director of marketing, sales and strategy. In 2002, David P. Scowsill was appointed as Opodo's CEO, replacing interim CEO Simon Tucker.

Prior to founding of Opodo, Orbitz was negotiating with European air carriers, trying to get a deal with them, but they were hesitant to participate in a company where the majority was owned by US carriers.

In 2004, the company was bought by Amadeus for 62 million euros.

Since 2011, Opodo is part of the largest online travel company in Europe, eDreams ODIGEO.

Products and services

Opodo Prime 
Opodo Prime has been named the leading online travel agent subscription service in the UK.  Launched in 2017, it was dubbed the ‘Netflix of travel’ due to its subscription-based pricing model.

The Opodo Prime subscription offers additional discounts on all flights as well as up to 50% off on over two million accommodation options. 

Membership to Opodo Prime costs £59.99 a year, and subscribers are reported to save an average of £215 for a week's holiday including flights and accommodation. Opodo Prime discounts can be used for up to 9 people on the same booking, across both flights and hotels.

Opodo Prime hotels 
Opodo launched Prime hotels as part of its Prime subscription service in June 2020. For the same yearly subscription fee, 2.1 million accommodation options with up to 50% off were added to Opodo Prime.

Flight price index dashboard 
In June 2020, Opodo unveiled its flight price index dashboard for the UK market. 

The service compares current flight prices with prices of the previous year, to suggest the optimum time to book flights. The dashboard uses over 14 billion data touch points from 660 airlines to generate year-on-year price comparisons. 

The price tracker dashboard uses AI-technology and gives customers more transparency over airline prices, thus helping them make informed decisions before purchasing a flight. 

Opodo plan to include a price prediction functionality in the future.

IPO
Parent company eDreams went public in 2014.   

Independent Board Member James Hare (James Otis Hare II) oversaw the public launch on April 4, 2014.

eDreams offered its stock at 10.25 Euros per share. 

That stock price had fallen to 1.02 Euros by October 24 of 2014, wiping out over one billion Euros of market capitalization. 

Some commentators called the launch “Europe’s worst performing IPO of 2014”.

eDreams moved quickly, asking their shareholders for authorization to “Discharge to Mr. James Otis Hare for the exercise of his mandate as director of the Company until his resignation as of 25 March, 2015.”

eDreams issued the following announcement: “Effective March 25, 2015, eDreams ODIGEO (“the Company”) accepts the resignation of Mr. James Hare as an Independent member from the Board of Directors”.

In June 2015, CEO Dana Dunne introduced a new strategy focusing on mobile, revenue diversification and customer experience improvements, which led to a strong turnaround in business performance.

Criticism

Poor customer service
, Opodo.com and opodo.co.uk have a “poor” rating of 2.7 stars out 5 on the online review platform Trustpilot, and a rating of 1.1 out of 5 on the review platform Reviewcentre. The UK consumer association "Which?" recommends members not to use Opodo. The majority of customer complaints focus on a serious lack of responsiveness from the Opodo customer care team, for instance not receiving a reply to an email in over a month, for them being "unreachable by phone," as well as many instances in which tickets booked and confirmed through Opodo are never actually reserved with the airline. In 2020 The Observer gave Opodo an award for the year's "worst customer service" after it began charging customers £16.49 to receive confirmation emails, "speedy" refunds and "free customer service".

Involvement in Israeli settlements

On 12 February 2020, the United Nations published a database of all business enterprises involved in certain specified activities related to the Israeli settlements in the Occupied Palestinian Territories, including East Jerusalem, and in the occupied Golan Heights. Opodo and its parent company, EDreams ODIGEO, have been listed on the database in light of their involvement in activities related to "the provision of services and utilities supporting the maintenance and existence of settlements". The international community considers Israeli settlements built on land occupied by Israel to be in violation of international law.

References

Online travel agencies
British travel websites
Internet properties established in 2001